The 2012 European Wrestling Championships were held in Belgrade, Serbia, from 8 March to 11 March 2012.

Medal table

Team ranking

Medal summary

Men's freestyle

Men's Greco-Roman

Women's freestyle

Participating nations
478 competitors from 41 nations participated:

 (10)
 (14)
 (9)
 (21)
 (21)
 (18)
 (7)
 (10)
 (2)
 (3)
 (7)
 (9)
 (12)
 (14)
 (21)
 (17)
 (7)
 (18)
 (1)
 (6)
 (15)
 (12)
 (13)
 (9)
 (19)
 (1)
 (2)
 (1)
 (7)
 (19)
 (4)
 (20)
 (20)
 (20)
 (12)
 (1)
 (10)
 (14)
 (10)
 (21)
 (21)

References

External links

Europe
European Wrestling Championships
European Wrestling Championships
2012 European Wrestling Championships
2012 in European sport
International sports competitions in Belgrade
March 2012 sports events in Europe
2010s in Belgrade